Alexandria High School is a public high school in Alexandria, Alabama, United States. It is part of Calhoun County Schools, serving grades 9-12.

Notable alumni
T. J. Heath - National Football League (NFL) cornerback

References

External links

Alexandra
Schools in Calhoun County, Alabama